This is a list of lost silent films released from 1920 to 1924.

References 

Silent, 1920-24
History of film
Lists of 1920s films
1920 in film
1921 in film
1922 in film
1923 in film
1924 in film
1920-related lists
1921-related lists
1922-related lists
1923-related lists
1924-related lists